The 1923 Kansas Jayhawks football team represented the University of Kansas in the Missouri Valley Conference (MVC) during the 1923 college football season. In their third season under head coach Potsy Clark, the Jayhawks compiled an overall record of 5–0–3 record with a mark of 3–0–3 against conference opponents, shared the MVC title with Nebraska, and were outscored by opponents by a combined total of 68 to 30. The season is, as of 2018, the last season the Jayhawks finished undefeated. They played their home games at Memorial Stadium in Lawrence, Kansas. Charles Black was the team captain.

Schedule

References

Kansas
Kansas Jayhawks football seasons
Missouri Valley Conference football champion seasons
College football undefeated seasons
Kansas Jayhawks football